Lincoln Island may refer to:

Lincoln Island (Alaska), an island in Lynn Canal in Alaska, United States
Lincoln Island, one of the Paracel Islands in the South China Sea known as Dōng Dǎo in Chinese and Đảo Linh-Côn in Vietnamese
Lincoln Island, a fictional island in Jules Verne's novel The Mysterious Island